Tafra Gam is a census village and Gram Panchayat in Lohit district, Arunachal Pradesh, India. As per the 2011 Census of India, Tafra Gam has total population of 1,805 people, including 785 males and 1,020 females.

References 

Villages in Lohit district